Leporinus acutidens is a species of Leporinus widely found in the Amazon River basin and Guiana rivers in South America. It has been reported in Argentina. 

This species can reach a length of  SL.

L. acutidens reproduces between November and March. Females become sexually mature after two year and males after one year. Females can produces 100,000 to 200,000 eggs when spawning.

References

Garavello, J.C. and H.A. Britski, 2003. Anostomidae (Headstanders). p. 71-84. In R.E. Reis, S.O. Kullander and C.J. Ferraris, Jr. (eds.) Checklist of the Freshwater Fishes of South and Central America. Porto Alegre: EDIPUCRS, Brasil.

Taxa named by Achille Valenciennes
Fish described in 1837
Anostomidae